El Lobista is an Argentine miniseries written by Patricio Vega, and it revolves around a manager with powerful contacts in power that specifies lucrative businesses for its clients. It stars Rodrigo de la Serna as the titular character. It is produced by El Trece, Pol-ka Producciones, Turner Latin America, TNT Latin America, Flow, and Cablevisión.  The series is premiered on 31 May 2018 on TNT Latin America.

Cast 
 Rodrigo de la Serna as Matías Franco
 Darío Grandinetti
 Leticia Brédice
 Julieta Nair Calvo
 Alberto Ajaka
 Belén Chavanne

References 

2018 Argentine television series debuts
Spanish-language television shows